The 1927–28 Polska Liga Hokejowa season was the second season of the Polska Liga Hokejowa, the top level of ice hockey in Poland. Five teams participated in the final round, and AZS Warszawa won the championship.

Final Tournament

External links
 Season on hockeyarchives.info

Polska Hokej Liga seasons
Polska
1927–28 in Polish ice hockey